Once More with Feeling is a 1960 studio album by the American singer Billy Eckstine. It was arranged by Billy May and produced by Teddy Reig.

Reception

In his review for Allmusic John Bush wrote that Eckstine was "looking back more than forward by 1960" and highlighted the re-recordings of older Eckstine hits and film theme songs on the album. Bush added that "It may read like a desultory date, and indeed it would have been if not for the presence of a solid jazz band and the surprisingly sympathetic arrangements of big-brass auteur Billy May. Eckstine had fronted some strong bands in the past and consequently doesn't need to strain his voice to equal the energy behind May's charts, even on unexpected swingers like "Stormy Weather" and "I Hear a Rhapsody." "I Apologize," one of the two remakes, is treated with glimmering strings that certainly suggest the '40s but work in the context of the adult-pop era as well". Billboard magazine gave Once More with Feeling four stars in March 1960, and wrote that "Mr. B is in as fine fettle here as he's been for some time...Old friends of Eckstein's [sic] will really go for this and he stands to make some new fans as well".

Track listing 
 "Once More with Feeling" (Billy Eckstine) - 3:02 
 "Stormy Weather" (Harold Arlen, Ted Koehler) - 3:55 
 "A Cottage for Sale" (Larry Conley, Willard Robison) - 3:26 
 "Blues in the Night" (Arlen, Johnny Mercer) - 3:09 
 "I Hear a Rhapsody" (Jack Baker, George Fragos, Dick Gasparre) - 2:37 
 "As Time Goes By" (Herman Hupfeld) - 3:24
 "That Old Black Magic" (Arlen, Mercer) - 3:18 
 "I Apologize" (Al Hoffman, Ed Nelson, Al Goodhart) - 3:19 
 "I Love You" (Cole Porter) - 2:40
 "With Every Breath I Take" (Ralph Rainger, Leo Robin) -  3:22 
 "Secret Love" (Sammy Fain, Paul Francis Webster) - 3:19
 "I'm Beginning to See the Light" (Johnny Hodges, Harry James, Duke Ellington, Don George) - 2:35 
 "Anything You Wanna Do (I Wanna Do with You)" (Phil Medley, Ray Passman) - 2:26 
 "Like Wow" (Eckstine) - 2:15

Personnel 
 Billy Eckstine - vocals, trumpet
 Billy May - conductor, arranger
 Joe Reisman - arranger
 Red Callender, Mike Rubin - double bass
 Irving Cottler - drums
 Arthur Gleghorn - flute
 Jack Cave, Jim Decker, Vincent DeRosa - french horn
 Bobby Gibbons - guitar
 Milt Raskin, Jimmy Rowles - piano
 Buddy Collette, Jules Jacob, Ronnie Lang - woodwind
 Benny Carter, Wilbur Schwartz - alto saxophone
 Fred Falensby, Justin Gordon - tenor saxophone
 Eddie Kusby, Dick Noel, Bill Schaeffer, Lloyd Ulyate - trombone
 Pete Candoli, Conrad Gozzo, Uan Rasey, Joe Triscari - trumpet
 Phil Stephen - tuba

Production
 Phil Macy, Al Schmitt - engineer
 Donald Elfman - liner notes
 Malcolm Addey - mastering, remixing
 Michael Cuscuna - reissue producer
 Teddy Reig - producer

References

1960 albums
Billy Eckstine albums
Albums arranged by Billy May
Albums conducted by Billy May
Roulette Records albums
Albums produced by Teddy Reig